Chicopa Creek is a stream in the U.S. state of Mississippi.

Chicopa Creek is a name derived from the Choctaw language meaning "feather creek".

References

Rivers of Mississippi
Rivers of Carroll County, Mississippi
Rivers of Holmes County, Mississippi
Mississippi placenames of Native American origin